Лв is a Cyrillic currency sign which may refer to:

 Bulgarian lev
 Kyrgyzstani som